John Robert McGraw (January 4, 1912 – June 19, 1976) was a Brigadier general (United States) in the United States Air Force, who served as flight surgeon during World War II.

Biography

He was born in Lakemont, Blair County, Pennsylvania, in 1912, to Howard and Emma McGraw. He graduated as salutatorian from Johnstown Senior High School, and graduated from the University of Pittsburgh School of Medicine in 1934 as a doctor of medicine.

Dr. McGraw worked in private practice from 1935 to 1936 in Pennsylvania as a general practitioner and surgeon. In 1937, on his 25th birthday, he entered military service as a first lieutenant in the U.S. Army. By 1942, within five years of joining the army, first lieutenant McGraw had advanced to the rank of colonel. In 1944, Colonel McGraw was reassigned to the position of Assistant Commandant of the AAF School of Aviation Medicine at Randolph Field (San Antonio) Texas.

In 1945, Colonel McGraw served in the European Theater of Operations. He then served as a surgeon in the Thirteenth Air Force in the Pacific Theater.  After World War II, Colonel McGraw returned to the School of Aviation Medicine at Randolph Field and served as the deputy commandant, and later as commandant.

In 1956, Colonel McGraw served as surgeon at the Headquarters Twelfth Air Force in Ramstein, Germany, and in 1958, he transferred to Wheelus Air Base in Tripoli, Libya. In 1961 Colonel McGraw was reassigned to Offutt Air Force Base in Omaha, Nebraska, where he was promoted to the rank of brigadier general.

Upon retirement from the Air Force, General McGraw moved to Miami, Florida, where he became the medical director for Eastern Air Lines. He died in Miami, Florida, in June 1976.

References

1912 births
1976 deaths
People from Blair County, Pennsylvania
United States Air Force generals
United States Army Air Forces personnel of World War II
United States Army Air Forces officers
Military personnel from Pennsylvania